Daniel Giraldo Correa (born 1 March 1984) is a Colombian Paralympic swimmer who competes at international elite swimming competitions. He is an eight-time Parapan American Games champion and has competed at the Paralympic Games three times.

References

1984 births
Living people
Sportspeople from Medellín
Paralympic swimmers of Colombia
Swimmers at the 2012 Summer Paralympics
Swimmers at the 2016 Summer Paralympics
Swimmers at the 2020 Summer Paralympics
Medalists at the 2011 Parapan American Games
Medalists at the 2019 Parapan American Games
S12-classified Paralympic swimmers
21st-century Colombian people